The University of Neuchâtel (UniNE) is a French-speaking public research university in Neuchâtel, Switzerland. The university has four faculties (schools) and more than a dozen institutes, including arts and human sciences, natural sciences, law and economics. The Faculty of Arts and Human Sciences, with 2,000 students, is the largest school of those that comprise the University of Neuchâtel.

The university has an annual budget of CHF 144 million and an annual research fund of CHF 40 million. Approximately 4,000 students, including 600 PhD students attend the university, and more than 600 diplomas, licences, doctorates and certificates are awarded each year. The university has more than 1,100 employees.

History 
The University of Neuchâtel superseded the Academy, which was created in 1838 by King Frederick William IV of Prussia, Prince of Neuchâtel. It awarded licentiate academic degrees in arts and sciences. In 1848, the Grand Council decreed the closing of the academy and in 1866 a new "academy" was established and finally renamed in 1909.

The University of Neuchâtel is situated at the heart of the French-speaking region of Switzerland, in Neuchâtel.

Before 2005, the University of Neuchâtel followed the French education model with some minor differences. The university now follows the academic standards of the Bologna Process which proposes a three-tiered system of university degrees, namely bachelor's degree, master's degree, and doctorate.

Academic programs 
University of Neuchatel offers classes in French as well as in English. Programs are classified at undergraduate and graduate level such as bachelor, Master and doctoral degree programs in disciplines like finance, computer science, law, economics, sciences and sports, journalism and mathematics to name a few.

In partnership with two other universities being De Montfort University in Leicester (England) and SDA Bocconi School of Management in Milan (Italy) and organised by the International Centre for Sport Studies (CIES), the University of Neuchatel also offers a FIFA Master in Management, Law and Humanities of Sport.

Faculties 
Faculty of Humanities
The largest faculty has around 2000 students. Its fields of research and study are Ancient and Middle Age Languages and Civilizations, Archeology, Art History, English Language and Literature, French Language and Literature, Logic, Museology and Philosophy. In Social Sciences, the Center for the Understanding of Social Processes (Maison d’analyse des processus sociaux, MAPS) is made up of five institutes: Anthropology, Geography, Psychology and Education, Swiss Forum for Migration and Population Studies and Sociology. It fosters cooperative work on interdisciplinary research projects.

Faculty of Science
The Faculty of Science numbers around 900 students. This faculty is active within different research domains, such as: Biology, Biogeosciences, Hydrogeology, Geothermal Science, Information Technology, Mathematics, Chemistry and Physics. It is the leading Swiss house for one of the National Centres of Competence in Research: Plant Survival.

Faculty of Law
A faculty with 560 students which offers six orientations within the Master : Business Law, International and European Law, Public Law, Health and Biotechnology Law, Sports Law, Judiciary Professions. It has a 3rd cycle International master's degree with the SDA Bocconi University of Milan and the de Montfort University of Leicester, in collaboration with FIFA and counts many institutes, such as the Institute of Health Law (IDS) or the International Sport Science Center (CIES).

Faculty of Economics
The Faculty of Economics has around 700 students and is the best faculty of the university. It offers a master's degree programs in many different fields: Financial Analysis, International Business Development, Public Economics, Public Politics and Management, Psychology of Labor and Organizations, Statistics, and Information Systems. Unique within Switzerland is the Academy of Journalism and Media: an integrated master's program, designed with professionals from the sector, focusing on the new needs of enterprise in the media world. The Bachelor in economics was evaluated as the best bachelor in Switzerland in front of the HSG.

Faculty of Theology (until 2015)
A small, historic building, the seat of the prestigious Bibliothèque des Pasteurs, houses the Faculty of Theology. Neuchâtel offered a common master's degree in theology, with the universities of Geneva and Lausanne. In 2015, the Faculty of Theology was closed; now the teaching and research in theology takes place at the University of Geneva and the University of Lausanne.

NSF Research Commission
The Research Committee is an organ of the Swiss National Science Foundation (SNSF) composed of members of the university.
It acts as an organ of SNSF, firstly by providing research grants for junior researchers and, second, by serving as counsel for grants for advanced research. On behalf of the rector, it sets the institutional notice required by the SNSF for applications filed with its divisions. It also claims expertise in scholarship and grant under the Fund of the university of donations and offers.

Institut de langue et civilisation françaises 
The Institut de langue et civilisation françaises (ILCF) of the University of Neuchâtel, to which the Cours d’été (Summer course) is linked, is a centre for specialised studies in the teaching of French to non-native speakers (FLE).

During the academic year it provides:

 training in French language, literature and cultural studies;
 specialised training for FLE teachers-to-be;
 remedial French courses to non-French-speaking students of the various faculties (Swiss mobility and Erasmus)

List of rectors since 1909

Three-year period

Four-year period

Associated institutions
 École romande de santé publique (ERSP)

People linked to the university

Honorary doctorates

Notes and references

See also
 List of largest universities by enrollment in Switzerland
 List of modern universities in Europe (1801–1945)

External links 

 University of Neuchâtel
 Information about the University of Neuchâtel

 
Educational institutions established in 1838
Buildings and structures in the canton of Neuchâtel
Neuchâtel
1838 establishments in Switzerland